Vince Martino (born March 19, 1947) is an American football coach. Most recently, he served as offensive line coach for the Montreal Alouettes of the Canadian Football League. Previously, Martino spent fifteen seasons in NFL Europe, including a stint as head coach of the Hamburg Sea Devils.

Coaching career
Martino was the head coach in NFL Europe for the Hamburg Sea Devils. He took over from Coach Jack Bicknell prior to the 2007 season, after Bicknell retired due to health reason. He guided the Sea Devils to a 7–3 record and a World Bowl Championship, defeating the Frankfurt Galaxy 38–27 in World Bowl XV.

References

1947 births
Living people
American football defensive tackles
Barcelona Dragons coaches
Boston College Eagles football coaches
Hamburg Sea Devils coaches
New Hampshire Wildcats football players
Scottish Claymores coaches
Sportspeople from Schenectady, New York